Scotia Square is a commercial development in the downtown core of Halifax, Nova Scotia, Canada. It was built in the late sixties to mid seventies and is managed by Crombie REIT. It is connected to the Downtown Halifax Link and serves as a major Halifax Transit bus terminal in Halifax.

History

Scotia Square was constructed in 1967, a neighbourhood was previously located where the complex now stands with the Cogswell Interchange. Scotia Square had previous tenants such as Famous Players theatre and a Woolco department store. The food court was also known as the Port of Call.

An expansion of the Scotia Square shopping centre, along Barrington Street, was built around 2016-17. It was designed by DSRA Architects of Halifax. The three-storey development adds street-level commercial space, as well as office and retail space above. According to Crombie REIT, the design was intended to bring the site into better agreement with municipal design guidelines mandating more pedestrian-oriented districts.

Location and layout

Scotia Square consists of a mall, a hotel, and a number of office towers connected to each other and to other buildings by pedways and tunnels. In the centre of the complex is Scotia Square Mall and a large food court servicing the adjoining office buildings. The complex is adjacent to the Cogswell Interchange, and it fronts on Duke Street to the south, Barrington Street to the east, and Albemarle Street (formerly Market Street) to the west.

Buildings

 Barrington Place (5 floors - 2 commercial and 3 hotel)
 Barrington Tower (20 floors, 84 metres)
 Brunswick Place (5 floors) – formerly called Trade Mart
 Cogswell Tower (20 floors - 14 office levels on top of 6 parkade levels - 79 metres)
 Duke Tower (14 floors atop 2 storey podium, 71 metres)
 Hotel Halifax (formerly the Delta Halifax)
 Barrington Hotel (formerly Delta Barrington, independent Since 2020)
 Scotia Square Mall (2 floors)
 1700-stall car park

Food court
The Scotia Square Mall food court was renovated in 2014 and named The Mix by Crombie REIT. The court features 14 different food vendors ranging from large fast food chains like McDonald's to locally owned vendors like Mama Gratti's Deli & Market. Various upgrades to seating during the renovation allows large foot traffic during lunchtime rushes during the week. Being based toward servicing those working downtown the hours of operation of most food court tenants are 9:30a.m. to 6:00p.m.

Pedways and tunnels
Pedway connecting Brunswick Street to the Scotia Square Parkade, and the west parkade stairwell. Passes over Albemarle Street (formerly Market Street).
Pedway connecting the northwest corner of Scotia Square Parkade (topmost level) to Brunswick Place (formerly called Trade Mart building), which is located beside Scotia Square Parkade, on the north side of Cogswell Street.
Tunnel connecting mall to World Trade and Convention Centre, as well as the Scotiabank Centre (formerly Halifax Metro Centre). Passes under Duke Street.
Three-level pedway going from Barrington & Duke Towers to a stairwell, which leads to parking and the mall. The middle level of this pedway joins up to the Brunswick Street Pedway mentioned above.
Pedway going from Scotia Square Mall, over Barrington Street, and into Barrington Place Shops. From there one can go via pedway to Purdy's Wharf, Casino Nova Scotia, the CIBC Building, and the TD Tower.

Future development
A new building, Westhill on Duke, is a proposed for the southwest corner of the complex on the corner of Duke Street and Albemarle Street. It comprises an 18-storey building with retail, residential, and office space with a more pedestrian-friendly street frontage than the current blank wall. Architects involved on the project are DSRA Architects and Zeidler Partnership Architects.

Halifax Transit terminal
Scotia Square is home to one of the busiest Halifax Transit terminals in the city; Scotia Square Terminal saw over 11,000 passengers board or alight on an average weekday in 2019/20. As of October 2021, it was served by 33 bus routes. Most of the buses stop on Barrington Street with the exception of the regional express (MetroX) routes, which are located on Albemarle Street, and route 2, which stops on Duke Street in the Clayton Park-bound direction.

References

External links
 

1969 establishments in Nova Scotia
Buildings and structures in Halifax, Nova Scotia
Brutalist architecture in Canada
Shopping malls established in 1969
Shopping malls in Halifax, Nova Scotia